ENP may refer to:

 Egyptian National Police
 Electroless nickel plating
 Emergency Nurse Practitioner
 Emergency Number Professional
 Emmenegger Nature Park, in Missouri
 English National Party
 Escuela Nacional Preparatoria, a high school system in Mexico
 European Neighbourhood Policy